Keith Sedgwick Donnellan (June 25, 1931 – February 20, 2015) was an American philosopher and professor of philosophy (later professor emeritus) at the University of California, Los Angeles.

Donnellan contributed to the philosophy of language, notably to the analysis of proper names and definite descriptions. He criticized Bertrand Russell's theory of definite descriptions for overlooking the distinction between referential and attributive use of definite descriptions.

Donnellan spent most of his career at UCLA, having also previously taught at the university where he had earned his PhD, Cornell University.

Philosophical work

Proper names
By 1970, analytic philosophers widely accepted a view regarding the reference-relation that holds of proper names and that which they name, known as descriptivism and attributed to Bertrand Russell. Descriptivism holds that ordinary proper names (e.g., 'Socrates', 'Richard Feynman', and 'Madagascar') may be paraphrased by definite descriptions (e.g., 'Plato's favorite philosopher', 'the man who devised the theory of quantum electrodynamics', and 'the largest island off the southeastern coast of Africa'). Saul Kripke gave a series of three lectures at Princeton University in 1970, later published as Naming and Necessity, in which he argued against descriptivism and sketched the causal-historical theory of reference according to which each proper name necessarily designates a particular object and that the identity of the object so designated is determined by the history of the name's use. These lectures were highly influential and marked the decline of descriptivism's popularity. Kripke's alternative view was, by his own account, not fully developed in his lectures. Donnellan's work on proper names is among the earliest and most influential developments of the causal-historical theory of reference.

Descriptions
"Reference and Definite Descriptions" has been one of Donnellan's most influential essays. Written in response to the work of Bertrand Russell and P. F. Strawson in the area of definite descriptions, the essay develops a distinction between the "referential use" and the "attributive use" of a definite description. The attributive use most nearly reflects Russell's understanding of descriptions. When a person uses a description such as "Smith's murderer" attributively, they mean to pick out the individual that fits that description, whoever or whatever it is. The referential use, on the other hand, functions to pick out who or what a speaker is talking about, so that something can be said about that person or thing.

Publications

See also
 American philosophy
 List of American philosophers

References

External links 

 Perry, John, "Donnellan at Cornell," [Preprint of article] In: Joseph Almog and Paulo Leonardi (eds.), Having in Mind: The Philosophy of Keith Donnellan. (2012)

1931 births
2015 deaths
20th-century American philosophers
Analytic philosophers
Philosophers of language
Cornell University alumni
Cornell University faculty
University of California, Los Angeles faculty